Sonnalli Seygall (born 1 May 1989) is an Indian actress whose film debut was 2011's Pyaar Ka Punchnama, directed by Luv Ranjan. She played Rhea opposite Rayo Bakhirta playing Vikrant Chaudhary. Sonnalli was also seen in Pyaar Ka Punchnama 2 and Wedding Pullav, both releasing on the same day (16 October). She was recently seen in an advertisement with Salman Khan for Thums Up.

She was a ramp model before she decided to try her luck at the Miss India Worldwide competition. She has featured in music videos for Prem, a Canadian singer (Times) and Dr. Zeus (Studio One). Having done anchoring at live events for Reebok, Castrol, Indiatimes, Filmfare, Times of India and Dadagiri (reality show), she has also performed at the Indian Embassy in Russia.

Sonnalli also played lead role in Jai Mummy Di, a romantic comedy starring Sunny Singh, Supriya Pathak and Poonam Dillon, directed by Navjot Gulati. The film was released on 17 January 2020.

Filmography

Films

Web series

Music videos

References

External links

 
 
 

Living people
Actresses from Mumbai
Female models from Mumbai
Indian film actresses
Miss International 2006 delegates
21st-century Indian actresses
Actresses in Hindi cinema
1989 births